Ogbomosho South is a Local Government Area in Oyo State, Nigeria. Its headquarters are located in Arowomole area of Ogbomosho.

It has an area of 88 km and a population of 185,815 at the 2006 census.
 
The postal code of the area is 210.

Ogbomoso South Local Government was formed in 1991 from the previous Ogbomoso Local Government by the Military Administration. Neighbourhoods in the Council include Idi- igba, Gaa- Lagbedu, Kajola, Kowe, Oke- Ola, Adeoye, Onidewure, Molete, Arowomole, Sanuaje, Obandi, Ijeru, Ayegun, and Oke Alapata.

Popular Places 
State Hospital Complex – Sodiq Sekendegbe Street, Arowomole

Secretariat Complex – Arowomole

The Apostolic Church, Alapata Assembly

National Museum, Arowomole

Nigerian Baptist Theological Seminary

Beulah Baptist Centre

State Library – Arowomole

Federal Housing Estate – Ibapon Road

Industrial Estate – Osogbo Road

Idi-Oro Baptist Church

Akande Market – Caretaker

DAD Foundation Sports Arena, Idi-Oro

Federal Road Safety Corps – Oluwatedo

Maryland Catholic High School

Methodist Cathedral – Arowomole

Berean Independent Baptist Church – Kajola

St Anne Catholic Church – Arinkinkin

St Ferdinand Catholic Church

Onpetu of Ijeru Palace

Government Technical college, Kajola

Baptist Secondary Grammar School, Ahoyaya.

The Apostolic Primary School II

Abede Primary School

The Apostolic Model School

Aarada Market – Osogbo Road

Ayegun Primary School II

A.U.D Primary School, Awoye Street.

Kajola Primary School

References

Local Government Areas in Oyo State